Koru is a small town centre in Kisumu County, Kenya, Africa (0.1833° S, 35.2667° E).  It forms an electoral ward of Muhoroni Constituency and Muhoroni town council. Koru is also a location in the Muhoroni division. It is at an elevation of 1540m.

Transport 
The town centre is served by a station on a lightly built branchline of the national railway system.  In 2009, this branchline was upgraded. Koru is located between the stations of Muhoroni and Fort Ternan.

Paleontology 
The first fossil remains, Proconsul, is a primate species. It was found in Koru in 1909 by a gold prospector.

Notable people 
 Robert Ouko, Kenyan foreign minister, was murdered near his home in Koru and his body was found at the nearby Got Alila hill.

References 

Populated places in Nyanza Province
Kisumu County